Cawood (other names: Carwood) is a large village (formerly a market town) and civil parish in the Selby District of North Yorkshire, England that is notable as the finding-place of the Cawood sword. It was historically part of the West Riding of Yorkshire until 1974.

Overview
According to Edmunds' "History in Names of Places" (London, 1869), the first syllable, Ca-, means a hollow, also a field.  Edmunds gives Cawood of Yorkshire as an example.  The last syllable -wood, is self-evident.  The name, therefore, is a place-name of Anglo-Saxon origin and was first used to describe one who lived in a wooded hollow or field.

In his King's England series, Arthur Mee refers to Cawood as "the Windsor of the North".  It used to be the residence of the Archbishops of York. Cawood is south of the point where the River Wharfe flows into the River Ouse which subsequently forms the northern border of the village. Cawood Bridge is the only bridge from the village which spans the river. The bridge was opened in 1872: before then the only means of crossing was by use of a ferry. Dick Turpin is said to have forded the river when he escaped to York, which lies ten miles north of Cawood. The River Ouse used to flood the village regularly in winter. Since the floods of January 1982, whose height is marked on the bridgekeeper's cottage, river defences have been raised so that the fields on the northern side (Kelfield Ings) and the former Ferry Boat Inn, also on the Kelfield side, are now the only areas that flood, even at times of exceptionally high waters, such as in November 2000.

The houses and shops are located around the remains of Cawood Castle which lies at its centre. This was the residence of the Archbishops of York who were forced to leave at the English Reformation. It is possible to stay in the Castle Gatehouse, which is a Landmark Trust property. This stands next to Castle Garth, a scheduled ancient monument, under which are the remains of the castle. It is currently owned by the village, but closely looked after by English Heritage and the local Garth group as a "green space" in the centre of the village.

The village used to house a host of public houses, but the Anchor, Thompson's Arms and the Bay Horse have closed. The three remaining pubs are: 
The Jolly Sailor is situated on Market Place in the village centre.
The Ferry Inn is located just by the swing bridge over the River Ouse with a beer garden fronting the river.
The family tree tea room is a little hidden gem on Thorpe Lane with quite out side seating.
The Castle Inn can be found on Wistowgate, heading towards Selby, has a restaurant and a caravan/camping site.

In the 19th century there was a weekly market on Wednesdays, and a wide range of shops. During the 20th century, these gradually closed as village commercial life became dominated by the nearby market towns of Selby, Leeds and York. Today there is just a post office, a plant nursery, a hairdresser's and All Saints' Church.
Cawood railway station provided a passenger service from 1898 to 1929 and continued to provide goods services until total closure in 1960.

There is an annual craft festival over August bank holiday weekend, in aid of the work of All Saints', where the villagers and local craft workers display their products at various venues throughout the village.

History
Cawood was formerly one of the chief places of residence of the Archbishop of York, who had here a magnificent Palace or Castle, in which several of the bishops died. It was obtained for the see of York from King Athelstan, in the 10th century, by Archbishop Wulstan. The village surrounded its walls. Alexander Nevil, the 45th Archbishop, is said to have bestowed great cost on this palace, and to have adorned it with several new towers. Henry Bowett, the 49th Archbishop, built the great hall; and his successor, Cardinal Kempe, erected the gatehouse, the ruins of which are all that remain of this once magnificent building.

In the 1800s Cawood was considered a market and parish-town, "in the wapentake of Barkston-Ash, liberties of St. Peter and Cawood, Wistow, and Otley; 5 miles from Selby, 7½ from Tadcaster, 10 from York, 12 from Pontefract, 186 from London." Cawood being within the Liberty of Cawood, Wistow, and Otley made the village administratively independent from the surrounding West Riding of Yorkshire.

Market was held each Wednesday. Fairs were held on Old May day and 23 September. The principal inn was named the Ferry House. The local church, a peculiar, was a vicarage, dedicated to All Saints, in the deanery of Ainsty (now New Ainsty). Notice of the union of the Liberty of Cawood, Wistow, and Otley with the West Riding of Yorkshire was published in the London Gazette on 21 March 1864. Some of the economic changes in the following decades were also due to increased transportation and agricultural mechanization. It remained part of the West Riding of Yorkshire until 1974.

Notable people
Notable people who were born or live in Cawood include:
Henry Monson, a founding New Zealand settler.
Michael Lyons FRBS FRSA, a contemporary British artist
and former Vice-President of the Royal British Society of Sculptors.

Notable people who died in Cawood include six Archbishops of York: William Greenfield, William Melton, Thomas Rotherham, John Thoresby, William Zouche and George Montaigne.

Also the children's nursery rhyme Humpty Dumpty may refer to Cardinal Wolsey's 'great fall' at Cawood, when he was arrested by King Henry VIII's men.

References

External links

 Cawood village history Cawood Village
 1820s family history transcriptions Genuki
 Local history Ross family website
 The Stillingfleet tragedy Stillingfleet
 All Saints' Church The church's website

 
Villages in North Yorkshire
Civil parishes in North Yorkshire